Wittgenstein's rod is a problem in geometry discussed by 20th-century philosopher Ludwig Wittgenstein.

Description
A ray is drawn with its  origin  on a circle, through an external point  and a point  is chosen at some constant distance from the starting end of the ray; what figure does  describe when all the initial points on the circle are considered? The shape described by  can be seen as a  'figure-eight' which in some cases degenerates to a single lobe looking like an inverted cardioid.

Wittgenstein sketched a mechanism and wrote:

This text has been included among the notes selected for publication in Remarks on the Foundations of Mathematics and the editors have dated in the as spring of 1944.

Related mechanism 
Wittgenstein's rod is a generalization of Hoeckens linkage.

Animations

See also
 Oscillating cylinder steam engine — a steam engine using a Wittgenstein's rod scribing a figure-of-eight shape (it does not make use of the curve scribed)

References

External links
Geometer's Sketchpad applet

Geometry
Ludwig Wittgenstein
Linkages (mechanical)